Legislative constituencies are used in Russia to elect half of the seats (225) in the State Duma. Each Federal Subject gets a certain amount of constituencies, proportional to their population, with every Federal Subject getting at least one. Every constituency is a single-mandate one, meaning each constituency sends one representative (also known as a Deputy) to the State Duma.

Constituencies are created and their boundaries drawn by the Central Election Commission. According to Federal Law, the layout of constituencies are to be used for 10 years. Using these current constituencies, elections were held to the State Duma in 2016 and 2021.

List 
Below is the list of Constituencies of Russia, organised by federal subject.

Adygea

 Adygea constituency (No. 1)

Altai Republic

 Altai constituency (No. 2)

Bashkortostan

 Ufa constituency (No. 3)
 Blagoveshchensk constituency (No. 4)
 Beloretsk constituency (No. 5)
 Neftekamsk constituency (No. 6)
 Salavat constituency (No. 7)
 Sterlitamak constituency (No. 8)

Buryatia

 Buryat constituency (No. 9)

Dagestan

 Northern constituency (No. 10)
 Central constituency (No. 11)
 Southern constituency (No. 12)

Ingushetia

 Ingush constituency (No. 13)

Kabardino-Balkaria

 Kabardino-Balkarian constituency (No. 14)

Kalmykia

 Kalmyk constituency (No. 15)

Karachay-Cherkessia

 Karachevo-Cherkess constituency (No. 16)

Republic of Karelia

 Karelian constituency (No. 17)

Komi Republic

 Syktyvkar constituency (No. 18)

Republic of Crimea

 Simferopol constituency (No. 19)
 Kerch constituency (No. 20)
 Yevpatoria constituency (No. 21)

Mari El

 Mari El constituency (No. 22)

Mordovia

 Mordovia constituency (No. 23)

Yakutia

 Yakutia constituency (No. 24)

North Ossetia

 North Ossetia constituency (No. 25)

Tatarstan

 Privolzhsky constituency (No. 26)
 Moskovsky constituency (No. 27)
 Nizhnekamsk constituency (No. 28)
 Naberezhnye Chelny constituency (No. 29)
 Almetyevsk constituency (No. 30)
 Central constituency (No. 31)

Tuva

 Tuva constituency (No. 32)

Udmurt Republic

 Udmurtia constituency (No. 33)
 Izhevsk constituency (No. 34)

Khakassia

 Khakassian constituency (No. 35)

Chechnya

 Chechnya constituency (No. 36)

Chuvashia

 Kanash constituency (No. 37)
 Cheboksary constituency (No. 38)

Altai Krai

 Barnaul constituency (No. 39)
 Rubtsovsk constituency (No. 40)
 Biysk constituency (No. 41)
 Slavgorod constituency (No. 42)

Zabaikalsky Krai

 Chita constituency (No. 43)
 Dauria constituency (No. 44)

Kamchatka Krai

 Kamchatka constituency (No. 45)

Krasnodar Krai

 Krasnodar constituency (No. 46)
 Krasnoarmeysky constituency (No. 47)
 Slavyansk-na-Kubani constituency (No. 48)
 Tuapse constituency (No. 49)
 Sochi constituency (No. 50)
 Tikhoretsk constituency (No. 51)
 Armavir constituency (No. 52)
 Kanevskaya constituency (No. 53)

Krasnoyarsk Krai

 Krasnoyarsk constituency (No. 54)
 Central constituency (No. 55)
 Divnogorsk constituency (No. 56)
 Yeniseysk constituency (No. 57)

Perm Krai

 Perm constituency (No. 58)
 Chusovoy constituency (No. 59)
 Kungur constituency (No. 60)
 Kudymkar constituency (No. 61)

Primorsky Krai

 Vladivostok constituency (No. 62)
 Artyom constituency (No. 63)
 Arsenyev constituency (No. 64)

Stavropol Krai

 Stavropol constituency (No. 65)
 Nevinnomyssk constituency (No. 66)
 Mineralnye Vody constituency (No. 67)
 Georgiyevsk constituency (No. 68)

Khabarovsk Krai

 Khabarovsk constituency (No. 69)
 Komsomolsk-na-Amure constituency (No. 70)

Amur Oblast

 Amur constituency (No. 71)

Arkhangelsk Oblast

 Arkhangelsk constituency (No. 72)
 Kotlas constituency (No. 73)

Astrakhan Oblast

 Astrakhan constituency (No. 74)

Belgorod Oblast

 Belgorod constituency (No. 75)
 Stary Oskol constituency (No. 76)

Bryansk Oblast

 Bryansk constituency (No. 77)
 Unecha constituency (No. 78)

Vladimir Oblast

 Vladimir constituency (No. 79)
 Suzdal constituency (No. 80)

Volgograd Oblast

 Volgograd constituency (No. 81)
 Krasnoarmeysky constituency (No. 82)
 Mikhaylovka constituency (No. 83)
 Volzhsky constituency (No. 84)

Vologda Oblast

 Vologda constituency (No. 85)
 Cherepovets constituency (No. 86)

Voronezh Oblast

 Voronezh constituency (No. 87)
 Pravoberezhny constituency (No. 88)
 Anna constituency (No.89)
 Pavlovsky constituency (No. 90)

Ivanovo Oblast

 Ivanovo constituency (No. 91)
 Kineshma constituency (No. 92)

Irkustsk Oblast

 Irkutsk constituency (No. 93)
 Angarsk constituency (No. 94)
 Shelekhov constituency (No. 95)
 Bratsk constituency (No. 96)

Kaliningrad Oblast

 Kaliningrad constituency (No. 97)
 Central constituency (No. 98)

Kaluga Oblast

 Kaluga constituency (No. 99)
 Obninsk constituency (No. 100)

Kemerovo Oblast

 Kemerovo constituency (No. 101)
 Prokopyevsk constituency (No. 102)
 Zavodskoy constituency (No. 103)
 Novokuznetsk constituency (No. 104)

Kirov Oblast

 Kirov constituency (No. 105)
 Kirovo-Chepetsk constituency (No. 106)

Kostroma Oblast

 Kostroma constituency (No. 107)

Kurgan Oblast

 Kurgan constituency (No. 108)

Kursk Oblast

 Kursk constituency (No. 109)
 Seimsky constituency (No. 110)

Leningrad Oblast

 Vsevolozhsk constituency (No. 111)
 Kingisepp constituency (No. 112)
 Volkhov constituency (No. 113)

Lipetsk Oblast

 Lipetsk constituency (No. 114)
 Levoberezhny constituency (No. 115)

Magadan Oblast

 Magadan constituency (No. 116)

Moscow Oblast

 Balashikha constituency (No. 117)
 Dmitrov constituency (No. 118)
 Kolomna constituency (No. 119)
 Krasnogorsk constituency (No. 120)
 Lyubertsy constituency (No. 121)
 Odintsovo constituency (No. 122)
 Orekhovo-Zuyevo constituency (No. 123)
 Podolsk constituency (No. 124)
 Sergiyev Posad constituency (No. 125)
 Serpukhov constituency (No. 126)
 Shchyolkovo constituency (No. 127)

Murmansk Oblast

 Murmansk constituency (No. 128)

Nizhny Novgorod Oblast

 Nizhny Novgorod constituency (No. 129)
 Prioksky constituency (No. 130)
 Avtozavodsky constituency (No. 131)
 Kanavinsky constituency (No. 132)
 Bor constituency (No. 133)

Novgorod Oblast

 Novgorod constituency (No. 134)

Novosibirsk Oblast

 Novosibirsk constituency (No. 135)
 Central constituency (No. 136)
 Iskitim constituency (No. 137)
 Barabinsk constituency (No. 138)

Omsk Oblast

 Omsk constituency (No. 139)
 Moskalenki constituency (No. 140)
 Lyubinsky constituency (No. 141)

Orenburg Oblast

 Orenburg constituency (No. 142)
 Buguruslan constituency (No. 143)
 Orsk constituency (No. 144)

Oryol Oblast

 Oryol constituency (No. 145)

Penza Oblast

 Penza constituency (No. 146)
 Lermontovsky constituency (No. 147)

Pskov Oblast

 Pskov constituency (No. 148)

Rostov Oblast

 Rostov constituency (No. 149)
 Nizhnedonskoy constituency (No. 150)
 Taganrog constituency (No. 151)
 Southern constituency (No. 152)
 Belaya Kalitva constituency (No. 153)
 Shakhty constituency (No. 154)
 Volgodonsk constituency (No. 155)

Ryazan Oblast

 Ryazan constituency (No. 156)
 Skopin constituency (No. 157)

Samara Oblast

 Samara constituency (No. 158)
 Tolyatti constituency (No. 159)
 Krasnoglinsky constituency (No. 160)
 Zhigulyovsk constituency (No. 161)
 Promyshlenny constituency (No. 162)

Saratov Oblast

 Saratov constituency (No. 163)
 Balakovo constituency (No. 164)
 Balashov constituency (No. 165)
 Engels constituency (No. 166)

Sakhalin Oblast

 Sakhalin constituency (No. 167)

Sverdlovsk Oblast

 Sverdlovsk constituency (No. 168)
 Kamensk-Uralsky constituency (No. 169)
 Beryozovsky constituency (No. 170)
 Nizhny Tagil constituency (No. 171)
 Asbest constituency (No. 172)
 Pervouralsk constituency (No. 173)
 Serov constituency (No. 174)

Smolensk Oblast

 Smolensk constituency (No. 175)
 Roslavl constituency (No. 176)

Tambov Oblast

 Tambov constituency (No. 177)
 Rasskazovo constituency (No. 178)

Tver Oblast

 Tver constituency (No. 179)
 Zavolzhsky constituency (No. 180)

Tomsk Oblast

 Tomsk constituency (No. 181)
 Ob constituency (No. 182)

Tula Oblast

 Tula constituency (No. 183)
 Novomoskovsk constituency (No. 184)

Tyumen Oblast

 Tyumen constituency (No. 185)
 Zavodoukovsk constituency (No. 186)

Ulyanovsk Oblast

 Ulyanovsk constituency (No. 187)
 Radishchevo constituency (No. 188)

Chelyabinsk Oblast

 Chelyabinsk constituency (No. 189)
 Metallurgichesky constituency (No. 190)
 Korkino constituency (No. 191)
 Magnitogorsk constituency (No. 192)
 Zlatoust constituency (No. 193)

Yaroslavl Oblast

 Yaroslavl constituency (No. 194)
 Rostov constituency (No. 195)

Moscow Federal City

 Babushkinsky constituency (No. 196)
 Kuntsevo constituency (No. 197)
 Leningradsky constituency (No. 198)
 Lyublino constituency (No. 199)
 Medvedkovo constituency (No. 200)
 Nagatinsky constituency (No. 201)
 New Moscow constituency (No. 202)
 Orekhovo–Borisovo constituency (No. 203)
 Perovo constituency (No. 204)
 Preobrazhensky constituency (No. 205)
 Tushino constituency (No. 206)
 Khovrino constituency (No. 207)
 Central constituency (No. 208)
 Cheryomushki constituency (No. 209)
 Chertanovo constituency (No. 210)

Saint Petersburg Federal City

 Eastern constituency (No. 211)
 Western constituency (No. 212)
 Northern constituency (No. 213)
 North East constituency (No. 214)
 North West constituency (No. 215)
 Central constituency (No. 216)
 South East constituency (No. 217)
 Southern constituency (No. 218)

Sevastopol Federal City

 Sevastopol constituency (No. 219)

Jewish Autonomous Oblast

 Jewish constituency (No. 220)

Nenets AO

 Nenets constituency (No. 221)

Khanty-Mansi AO

 Khanty-Mansiysk constituency (No. 222)
 Nizhnevartovsk constituency (No. 223)

Chukotka AO

 Chukotka constituency (No. 224)

Yamalo-Nenets AO

 Yamalo-Nenets constituency (No. 225)

Russian gerrymandering 
Gerrymandering is the process of drawing the boundaries of electoral districts to favor a certain political force. In Russia, this comes through the "Lepestkovy" (Russian: лепестковый) drawing of constituencies. These "Lepestkovy" drawing usually involves major cities and/or regional capitals being split up between multiple constituencies. This is done to split up urban voters (who tend to be more liberal) and pair them up with a bigger rural population. This is present in many of Russia's constituencies.

Redistricting 
Constituencies are created and their boundaries drawn by the Central Election Commission. According to Federal Law, the layout of constituencies are to be used for 10 years.

The 2015-2025 layout was created on the basis that there are 109,902,583 voters in all of Russia.

The number of constituencies a Federal Subject is entitled to is determined using the Hare Quota. By dividing the total number of voters in Russia (109,902,583) by 225 (the total amount of Deputies, elected through single-mandate constituencies), you get 488,455.924, the desired average number of voters in a constituency, also known as the "Government Norm" (GN). The next step is to divide the number of voters in a Federal Subject by the GN, and then rounding down to the lowest whole number. If the remainder is sizeable, then the Federal Subject receives an additional constituency. Table with examples below.

Former Constituencies 

Bashkortostan

 Kalininsky constituency (No. 3)
 Sovetsky constituency (No. 7)

Primorsky Krai

 Ussuriysk constituency (No. 53)

Stavropol Krai

 Petrovsky constituency (No. 56)

Vladimir Oblast

 Kovrov constituency (No. 69)

Kursk Oblast

 Lgov constituency (No. 98)

Lipetsk Oblast

 Yelets constituency (No. 102)

Moscow Oblast

Noginsk constituency (No. 110)

Murmansk Oblast

 Monchegorsk constituency (No. 115)

Nizhny Novgorod Oblast

 Dzerzhinsk constituency (No. 119)

Novosibirsk Oblast

 Zavodskoy constituency (No. 125)

Omsk Oblast

 Central constituency (No. 130)

Rostov Oblast

 Kamensk-Shakhtinsky constituency (No. 144)

Ryazan Oblast

 Shilovo constituency (No. 150)

Samara Oblast

 Novokuybyshevsk constituency (No. 151)

Smolensk Oblast

 Vyazma constituency (No. 168)

Tambov Oblast

 Michurinsk constituency (No. 170)

Tver Oblast

 Bezhetsk constituency (No. 172)

Tula Oblast

 Shchyokino constituency (No. 177)

Tyumen Oblast

 Ishim constituency (No. 178)

Moscow Federal City

 Universitetsky constituency (No. 201)

Saint Petersburg Federal City

 Admiralteysky constituency (No. 206)
 South West constituency (No. 212)

Komi-Permyak AO

Komi-Permyak constituency (No. 216)

Koryak AO

Koryak constituency (No. 217)

Taymyr AO

 Taymyr constituency (No. 219)

Ust-Orda Buryat AO

 Ust-Orda Buryat constituency (No. 220)

Evenk AO

 Evenk constituency (No. 224)

Russian State Duma Election results by constituency

2016 election results
Detailed Results of the 2016 Russian legislative Election by constituency.

2021 election results
Results of the 2021 Russian legislative election by constituency.

References

See also 

 Results of the 2016 Russian legislative election by constituency
Political divisions of Russia

Federal Assembly (Russia)